Zheng Lianjie (born 7 August 1962) is a Chinese contemporary artist, active in performance art, installation, photography, contemporary ink and video art. Zheng Lianjie is a representative figure in Chinese contemporary art. He is part of a generation of artists who grew up in China during the Cultural Revolution and in the 1980s turned from traditional forms of painting to installation art and performance-based work

Life and work
Born in 1962 in Beijing, Zheng Lianjie is a representative figure among the group of Chinese artists working abroad. Zheng divides his time between Beijing and New York. As a teenager, he studied traditional Chinese calligraphy and poetry and has continued to devote himself to the further exploration of ink painting and calligraphy over the past 30 years. His work spans a wide array of genres and styles, including calligraphy, contemporary ink painting, performance art, video, installation, sculpture, and conceptual photography.

In the early 1980s, Zheng spent 3 years at Palace Museum in Beijing studying traditional Chinese painting. In 1986, Zheng founded one of the earliest painting schools in Beijing, “Beijing Earth Calligraphy and Painting Art School.” In 1992, Zheng's ink painting “Dance of the East” was awarded the Gold Prize in Korea's 9th International Art Show. The Korean Association of Artists held an award ceremony in Zheng's honor at the Tianlun Dynasty Hotel, which was widely covered in the local media, including Xinhua News Agency, CCTV, China Daily and China Youth Daily Newspaper. This early exposure introduced Zheng's artistic achievements to a much wider audience and heralded him as the first Chinese artist to initiate cultural and artistic exchange between China and Korea.

Moving into the mid 1980s, Zheng started experimenting with contemporary ink, and traveling all over China. He participated in Beijing's Yuanmingyuan art group in the late 1980s.(following Tiananmen Square protests of 1989) It was also during this time that Zheng began to become known for his subversive and critical stance toward conservative artistic language and pursuit of a new independent and individualistic style. He once said in early 1990s: “Avant-garde art should be a sharp knife, a weeping flower”. Zheng turned to performance and installation art in the late 1980s. He is one of the earliest artists in China to integrate performance art with the natural environment.

Zheng immigrated to the United States in 1996, while he continued to explore the experimental side of contemporary ink painting and calligraphy, he also continued to use his body itself as a means to ponder immigration, assimilation and the different psychological challenges faced by individuals and society from different cultural backgrounds. Several performance pieces from this period would become important chapters of contemporary Chinese performance art history.

Between 2004 and 2008, Zheng Lianjie returned to China once a year to make a pilgrimage to the holy Taoist Mount Hua. During his time on Huashan, Zheng meditated with a Taoist monk, an experience that would have a profound impact on his ink paintings and calligraphy from this period. Zheng's works fuses Taoism and natural aesthetics together, earning great critical acclaim. Zheng's work has been included in numerous exhibitions, symposiums and public art projects held all over the world. During the 2000s, Zheng Lianjie delivered invited talks and held exhibitions at major universities, including Harvard and Columbia. His work has also been featured in major media outlets such as The New York Times and The Asahi Shimbun. His works have been collected by museums, galleries, universities and several international private collectors.
 
In 2012,Zhenglianjie was named as United Nations Messenger of Peace in LinZhou, China in recognition of his distinguished achievement in the art field.

Selected artworks
 1989, 1994, 1995 Contemporary ink series: “Tiananmen,”  “Journal On The Sea,” “Rock & Roll Narrative,”  “West Mountain in Wind and Rain,” “Spring,” “Black Rain,” “Dance of Death.”
 1989, Installation: “For Forgotten Time”
 1989–1993, Contemporary ink series: “The Wall” (a series of ink paintings commemorating the German reunification)
 1990, Performance Photography: “Showering in Gray Wind” (performance photography at the Simatai Section of The Great Wall)
 1993，Mixed media performance series: “Huge Explosion: Binding The Lost Soul.”  (For this large scale outdoor performance/installation piece, Zheng Lianjie mobilized more than a hundred people including peasants from villages near the Great Wall and college students to participate. The project spanned 17 days and utilized traditional Chinese religious rituals to examine social reality and delve into personal trauma. This work has had a lasting impact on the Chinese art world since the 1990s and has been subject of numerous critical studies.)
 1998, Performance art: “Subzero New York” (New York)
 1999, Performance art: “X-RAY “(New York)
 2000, Performance art: “Time/Line-2000” (Beijing)
 2001, Performance art: “Floating Table” (Beijing)
 2001–present, Performance art series: “American Wasteland” (New York)
 1998–present, New Ink Painting Series: “After the Century,” “New York memories，“City ruins,” “Commemorating 911,” “Zero scenery.”
 1997–2003, Performance video trilogy: “Uniform” (1997)，“Apple” (2001), “Face” (2003).
 2004–2008, Performance video series: “Huashan Project: Ode to the Mountain”，“Huashan Project：Snow”. (Ink painting and photography series on  Mount Hua).
 2004–2007, photography: “Tao of Huashan” series.
 2005–present, Public art design: “Shanghai Pavilion” (New York), “Roseland” (New York).

Exhibitions
 2011  Inter Mediate Contemporary Chinese art exhibition at the The College of New Jersey Art Gallery in the College of New Jersey
 2010  Natura contemporary Art Crossing Art Gallery Hillwood Art Museum Long Island University New York
 2009  Over the Wall Contemporary Art Next Gallery New York
 2008  21st Century Ink Academic Exhibition China National Art Gallery
 2008  Chinese Traditions Reconfigured Amy Simon Fine Art, Connecticut U.S.A.
 2007  Made in China Chinese Contemporary Art Louisiana Museum of Modern Art Humlebaek Denmark
 2007  the Israel Museum in Jerusalem China Onward The Estella Collection Contemporary Art, 1966－2006
 2007  Against the Wall Contemporary Chinese Artists Corkin Gallery Toronto
 2007  The Power of The Universe The Frontier of Contemporary Chinese Art Asia Art Center Beijing
 2006  Albright–Knox Art Gallery, University at Buffalo Anderson Gallery and Center for the Arts New York U.S.A
 2006  New Chinese Occidentalism-Chinese Contemporary Art in New York Ethan Cohen Fine Arts
 2006  East transplanted West CAS Gallery Kean University U.S.A.
 2006  International Chinese live art festival Performance Art of Zheng Lianjie  (video slide discussion ) Manchester English
 2005  The Wall Reshaping Contemporary Chinese Art 2005-2006 Millennium Art Museum Beijing China
 2004  Colgate University Performance Art of ZhengLianjie (video slide discussion) U.S.A.
 2003  Swarthmore College Performance Art of ZhengLianjie (video slide discussion) U.S.A
 2002  Contemporary Ink Works by Zheng Lianjie (solo exhibition) Agama Gallery, New York, NY
 2002  Reappearing Exit IV: Performance Art of Zheng Lianjie (solo exhibition)Asian American Arts Centre, New York, U.S.A.
 2002  Selected works of performance Art  (exhibition/discussion) The 2nd Annual International Photography Festival, Pingyao, China
 2002  The First Guangzhou Triennial, China (group exhibition/discussion) Guangzhou, China Performance Art of Zheng Lianjie  (video slide discussion )
 2000  Conceptual Ink” (group exhibition) Ethan Cohen Fine Arts, New York, NY
 2000  Documentation of Chinese Avant-Garde Art in the 90's (group exhibition) Fukuoka Asian Art Museum, Fukuoka, Japan
 1998  Binding The Lost Souls;Huge Explosion (video discussion) Harvard University Ye-ching Library
 1993  Modern Chinese Painting” (group exhibition) National Contemporary Art Society of Israel
 1992  Contemporary Chinese Art” (group exhibition) Brussels Art Festival, Brussels, Belgium
 1991  Korea's Ninth Annual International Art Exhibition Seoul, Korea (awarded First Prize)
 1990  New Works by Zheng Lianjie and Huan Zi (two person exhibition) Sponsored by the Cultural Bureau of the British Embassy, Beijing
 1990  Ink Revolution  (solo exhibition) Beijing Daqian Gallery, Beijing, China

References

External links

 
 YouTube Interview Clean Air Auction 香港健康空气行动慈善拍卖
Official website on Artron.com 郑连杰官方网站
Zheng Lianjie Weibo on Sina  郑连杰新浪官方微博

1962 births
Living people
Artists from Beijing
Chinese contemporary artists
Chinese performance artists
Chinese photographers